Amine Khadiri (born 20 November 1988) is a Moroccan-born Cypriot middle-distance runner who competes primarily in the 1500 metres. He has won multiple medals at the Games of the Small States of Europe.

International competitions

Personal bests
Outdoor
800 metres – 1:47.22 (Kessel-Lo 2015)
1000 metres – 2:20.37 (Cheb 2015)
1500 metres – 3:39.50 (Huelva 2016)
One mile – 3:59.33 (Cork 2017)
3000 metres – 8:10.98 (Tel Aviv 2017)
5000 metres – 14:12.89 (Limassol 2017)
Half marathon – 1:11:11 (Paphos 2010)
Indoor
1500 metres – 3:45.16 (Istanbul 2015)
3000 metres – 7:55.32 (Istanbul 2018)

References

1988 births
Living people
Cypriot male middle-distance runners
Athletes (track and field) at the 2018 Commonwealth Games
Commonwealth Games competitors for Cyprus
Sportspeople from Casablanca
Cypriot people of Moroccan descent
Athletes (track and field) at the 2022 Mediterranean Games
Mediterranean Games competitors for Cyprus